Lodbrog is a  cable-laying ship that was built as a freight ferry. She was built in 1983 as Siegelberg and completed in 1985 for Romanian owners as Tuzla. In 1996 she was renamed Bolero. The ship was renamed Lodbrog after conversion to a cable layer in 2001.

Description
The ship had  lane capacity and could carry 12 passengers.

History

The ship was built as yard number 154 by VEB Mathias Thesen Werft, Wismar, East Germany. She was launched on 29 November 1983 as Siegelberg and then laid up unfinished. In 1985, she was completed as Tuzla for Compania de Navigatie Romline, Constanța, Romania. The IMO number 8306591 was allocated. She served in the Black Sea. on 12 May 1990, Tuzla was involved in a collision with the Soviet ship . In 1993, she was placed under the Cypriot flag, with Limassol as her port of registry. She was placed back under the Romanian flag in 1995.

From 28 April 1996, Tuzla was chartered by Seatruck Ferries and renamed Bolero. She was one of the first two ferries chartered by Seatruck. Bolero was employed on the Heysham–Warrenpoint route. On 14 May 1997, she was chartered by Argoman and employed on the Harwich–Cuxhaven–Åbo route until the charter ended on 28 May 1997. Between June and August 1997, Bolero was chartered by Estline and employed on the Stockholm–Tallinn route. In September 1997 she was chartered to Norfolk Line and employed on the Felixstowe–Scheveningen route.

On 16 October 2000, Bolero was sold to Alcatel Submarine Networks Marine, Copenhagen, Denmark, and was renamed Lodbrog. She was laid up in Leirvik, Norway. In 2001 she was rebuilt as a cable-laying ship by Remontowa, Gdańsk, Poland. She is now powered by two SKL Magdeburg diesel engines of  each.

References

External links
Lodbrog website (in Danish)

1983 ships
Ships of Seatruck Ferries
Ships built in East Germany
Merchant ships of Bulgaria
Merchant ships of Cyprus
Merchant ships of Denmark
Ferries of the United Kingdom
Cable laying ships
Ships built in Wismar